HD 211415 is a double star in the constellation Grus. With an apparent visual magnitude of 5.33, it is visible to the naked eye. The annual parallax shift is 72.54 mas, which yields a distance estimate of 45 light years. It has a relatively high proper motion, traversing the celestial sphere at the rate of 93.4 mas per year, and is moving closer to the Sun with a radial velocity of −13 km/s.

As of 1994, the two members of this system have an angular separation of 2.884″ along a position angle of 34.935°. Their projected separation is 39.8 AU. The pair are most likely gravitationally-bound with an orbit is probably being viewed nearly edge-on and a semimajor axis of around 100 AU.

HD 211415 was identified in September 2003 by astrobiologist Margaret Turnbull from the University of Arizona in Tucson as one of the most promising nearby candidates for hosting life based on her analysis of the HabCat list of stars. It is a G-type main-sequence star with a stellar classification of G0 V.

References

External links 
 Spectra HD 211415
 
 
 
 

Binary stars
G-type main-sequence stars
M-type main-sequence stars
HD, 211415
Grus (constellation)
Durchmusterung objects
0853
211415
110109